St. Jerome Church may refer to:

Franciscan Church, Vienna or Church of St. Jerome, Vienna, Austria
Saint Jerome of the Croats in Rome, Italy
Monastery of Saint Jerome (Granada), a church and monastery in Granada, Spain
Saint Jerome Parish Church in Morong, province of Rizal, Philippines
St Jerome's Church, Llangwm, Monmouthshire, Wales, UK
St. Jerome Church (Norwalk, Connecticut), US
St. Jerome Croatian Catholic Church in the Bridgeport community area of Chicago, Illinois, US
St. Jerome's Church (Bronx, New York), US
St. Jerome Church (Mapusa), Goa, India
St. Jerome Church (Kashimira), Mira Road, India.

See also
Saint Jerome's Academy
St. Jerome's University, Waterloo
Saint Jerome High School
Fancy Farm, Kentucky, a community that grew around St. Jerome Church, built in 1836